América is a city in Buenos Aires Province, Argentina, and the head town of the Rivadavia Partido, located some  from Buenos Aires City and  from the provincial capital, La Plata.

Its population was, as per the 2010 census, 11,685.

External links

Populated places established in 1904
Populated places in Buenos Aires Province
Cities in Argentina
Argentina